Ruokolahti Church is the Lutheran church in the town centre of Ruokolahti, in south-eastern Finland, and the main church of the Ruokolahti parish.

The church was designed in 1852 by a leading architect of the mid-19th century in Finland, Ernst Lohrmann, constructed of timber, and completed in 1854. The belfry predates the current church by 100 years, having been built in 1752 for the previous church in the same spot. The church and belfry have been designated and protected by the Finnish Heritage Agency as a nationally important built cultural environment (Valtakunnallisesti merkittävä rakennettu kulttuuriympäristö).

The current altarpiece is a 1915 painting by Alexandra Frosterus-Såltin, titled Kristus ristillä ('Christ on the cross'). It is her 50th and final altarpiece.

Ruokolahti Church is featured in a famous 1887 painting by Albert Edelfelt, Ruokolahden eukkoja kirkonmäellä ( 'Women outside the Church at Ruokolahti'), housed in the Ateneum art museum of the Finnish National Gallery in Helsinki.

References

Buildings and structures in South Karelia
Ernst Lohrmann buildings
Lutheran churches in Finland
19th-century Lutheran churches
Churches completed in 1854
19th-century churches in Finland